Sonjas Rückkehr is a 2006 Swiss Drama film produced for the Swiss television SRF.

Plot (excerpt) 
Sonja Knecht (Melanie Winiger) was sentenced to six years in prison for the alleged murder of her husband. Sonja travels to her hometown where the 28-year-old mother rents a room. She wants to see her son, watching him undetected in the schoolyard and learns from his mouth "my mum is dead" as the eight-year-old boy was teased by other school children because his prison mother. The further contact is initially prohibited: Tim lives with her in-law parents Armin and Julia which Sonja has entrusted her then two-year-old son. Armin forces after another contact trial by Sonja, and that she has to live in an open living group as Sonja broke the rules of probation. To obtain the legal custody of  her son, Sonja contacts  Stefan, the only witness of the murder night and asks him to finally admit the truth.

Cast 
 Melanie Winiger as Sonja
 Marlon Altenburger as Tim
 Urs Hefti as Armin Berger
 Michael Finger as Stefan
 Suly Röthlisberger as Silvia
 Renate Steiger as Elvira
 Andreas Matti as probationer Brändli
 Herbert Leiser as father of Sonja
 Oliver Zgorelec as Dejan
 Fitore Aliu as Tatjana
 Anette Wunsch as prison director
 Philippe Graber as police officer
 Hanspeter Bader as innkeeper
 Eva Lenherr as supervisor
 Anne Marie Hafner as Dora

Reception 
First aired at the 12e Cinéma Tout Écran – Festival international du cinéma et de télévision, Competition in Genève on 30 October 2006, Sonjas Rückkehr was presented on occasion of the 42nd Solothurn Film Festival on 22 January 2007.

The Swiss cinema magazine Cinema claimed "a touching, spirited and deeply in the Swiss Plateau mentality founded melodrama that could inspire more than 600,000 spectators on a Sunday evening".

Production 
Sonjas Rückkehr was filmed in April 2006 at locations in the canton of Zürich and was produced for the Swiss television SRF in Swiss German. For international use, the original title Sonjas Rückkehr may refer to Her Second Chance.

Home media 
The television film was released on DVD (RC 2) on 6 July 2006.

Awards 
 2006: Geneva Cinéma Tout Ecran, Grand Prix for Best Swiss TV Film won Best Film for Tobias Ineichen.

References

External links 
 

2006 drama films
Swiss television films
Swiss drama films
2000s German-language films
German-language television shows
2006 television films
2006 films
Swiss German-language films
Films shot in Zürich